Avramidis is a Greek surname (female version Avramidi or Avramidou) and may refer to:

Dimitrios Avramidis, 21st president of AEK Athens F.C.
Joannis Avramidis (Iωάννης Aβραμίδης) (1922–2016), Greek-Austrian sculptor
Stavros Avramidis (Σταύρος Αβραμίδης), professor at the University of British Columbia, Vancouver, Canada
Vasilis Avramidis (born 1977), professional football defender

Greek-language surnames
Surnames